Karpovskoye is a rural locality (a village) in Staroselskoye Rural Settlement, Vologodsky District, Vologda Oblast, Russia. The population was 25 as of 2002.

Geography 
Karpovskoye is located 45 km southwest of Vologda (the district's administrative centre) by road. Korytovo is the nearest rural locality.

References 

Rural localities in Vologodsky District